Piotr Marcin Gacek (born 16 September 1978) is a former Polish volleyball player, member of the Poland men's national volleyball team in 2005–2010 and 2015–2016, 2009 European Champion, silver medallist of the 2006 World Championship, two–time Polish Champion (2009, 2010).

Personal life
Gacek was born in Grodków, Poland. Married twice, his first wife was Agata. On September 27, 2008 he married Karolina. In August 2010 his wife gave birth to their daughter Zofia.

Career

Clubs
His first professional club was SKS Mechanik Nysa and then he played for PGE Skra Bełchatów. With the club from Bełchatów he achieved the titles of Polish Champion (2009, 2010). In 2010-2014 he played for Polish club ZAKSA Kędzierzyn-Koźle. He won with this club from Kędzierzyn-Koźle the silver medal of CEV Cup 2011, silver (2011), bronze medal (2012) of Polish Championships and two Polish Cups in 2013 and 2014. In 2014 he moved to LOTOS Trefl Gdańsk. On April 19, 2015 LOTOS Trefl Gdańsk, including Gacek, achieved the Polish Cup 2015. Then he won silver medal of the Polish Championship. In May 2015 he signed a two-year contract with LOTOS Trefl Gdańsk.

Gacek ended up sporting career on April 13, 2017 after last match of the 2016–17 PlusLiga at Ergo Arena. He was chosen Most Valuable Player of the match with Cerrad Czarni Radom.

National team
Piotr Gacek was in the Polish squad when the Polish national team won the gold medal of the European Championship 2009. On September 14, 2009 he was awarded Knight's Cross of Polonia Restituta.

He announced his retirement from national team on June 5, 2016. On August 26, 2017, before the match Poland – Finland at the 2017 European Championship in Ergo Arena, Gdańsk, was held a brief ceremony to thank him for career in national team. He played 114 matches in Polish national team.

Sporting achievements
 CEV Cup
  2010/2011 – with ZAKSA Kędzierzyn-Koźle

 National championships
 2007/2008  Polish Cup, with AZS Częstochowa
 2007/2008  Polish Championship, with AZS Częstochowa
 2008/2009  Polish Cup, with PGE Skra Bełchatów
 2008/2009  Polish Championship, with PGE Skra Bełchatów
 2009/2010  Polish Championship, with PGE Skra Bełchatów
 2010/2011  Polish Championship, with ZAKSA Kędzierzyn-Koźle
 2012/2013  Polish Cup, with ZAKSA Kędzierzyn-Koźle
 2012/2013  Polish Championship, with ZAKSA Kędzierzyn-Koźle
 2013/2014  Polish Cup, with ZAKSA Kędzierzyn-Koźle
 2014/2015  Polish Cup, with LOTOS Trefl Gdańsk
 2014/2015  Polish Championship, with LOTOS Trefl Gdańsk
 2015/2016  Polish SuperCup, with LOTOS Trefl Gdańsk

Individual awards
 2006: Polish Championship – Best Libero
 2008: Polish Cup – Best Defender
 2009: Polish Cup – Best Receiver
 2013: Polish Cup – Best Receiver
 2015: Polish Cup – Best Receiver

State awards
 2006:  Gold Cross of Merit
 2009:  Knight's Cross of Polonia Restituta

References

1978 births
Living people
People from Grodków
Sportspeople from Opole Voivodeship
Polish men's volleyball players
Polish Champions of men's volleyball
AZS Częstochowa players
Skra Bełchatów players
ZAKSA Kędzierzyn-Koźle players
Trefl Gdańsk players
Recipients of the Gold Cross of Merit (Poland)
Knights of the Order of Polonia Restituta
Liberos